oro Merenguero is a 2000 merengue album by Ashley.
This CD called Oro Merenguero meaning gold merengue 
is Ashley greatest hits CD with her hit songs from the past.

Track Listing Cd1
 YO SOY LA REINA
 ABRAZAME
 AQUI SI HAY
 BELLO
 DIME
 DONDE ESTAS CORAZON
 EL NENE DE LA ESCUELA
 EL NENE SEXY
 EL TRUCO
 ESE MORENO

Track Listing Cd2
 LA CHICA DEL SWING
 MALA
 ME GUSTA BAILAR
 MI NOVIO SE CURO
 QUE PENA DE ESTE AMOR
 SECRETARIA
 TODITA TUYA
 VETE DE AQUI
 YO TENGO UN RITMO
 YO SOY LA BOMBA

Ashley (singer) compilation albums
1999 greatest hits albums
Spanish-language compilation albums